The Phoney War was an eight-month period at the start of World War II, during which there was only one limited military land operation on the Western Front, when French troops invaded Germany's Saar district. Nazi Germany carried out the invasion of Poland on 1 September 1939.  The Phoney period began with the declaration of war by the United Kingdom and France against Nazi Germany on 3 September 1939, after which little actual warfare occurred, and ended with the German invasion of France and the Low Countries on 10 May 1940. Although there was no large-scale military action by Britain and France, they did begin some economic warfare, especially with the naval blockade, and shut down German surface raiders. They created elaborate plans for numerous large-scale operations designed to cripple the German war effort. These included opening an Anglo-French front in the Balkans, invading Norway to seize control of Germany's main source of iron ore, and an embargo against the Soviet Union which supplied Germany's main source of oil. By April 1940, the lone execution of the Norway plan was considered inadequate to stop the German offensive.

The quiet of the Phoney War was punctuated by a few Allied actions. In the Saar Offensive in September, the French attacked Germany with the intention of assisting Poland, but it fizzled out within days and they withdrew. In November, the Soviets attacked Finland in the Winter War, resulting in much debate in France and Britain about an offensive to help Finland, but the forces finally assembled for this campaign were delayed until it ended in March. The Allied discussions about a Scandinavian campaign caused concern in Germany and resulted in the German invasion of Denmark and Norway in April, and the Allied troops previously assembled for Finland were redirected to Norway instead. Fighting there continued until June when the Allies evacuated, ceding Norway to Germany in response to the German invasion of France.

On the Axis side, the Germans launched attacks at sea in the autumn and winter against British aircraft carriers and destroyers, sinking several including the carrier  with the loss of 519 lives.  Action in the air began on 16 October 1939 when the Luftwaffe launched air raids on British warships. There were various minor bombing raids and reconnaissance flights on both sides.

Terminology
The initial term used by British people for this period was Bore War. While this was probably coined as a play on the Boer War fought approximately four decades earlier, eventually the Americanism Phoney War became favoured on both sides of the Atlantic, probably (especially in the British Empire and Commonwealth) in large part to avoid confusion with the aforementioned earlier conflict. The term Phoney War customarily appears using the British spelling even in North America, rather than the American phony, although some American sources do not follow the pattern. The first known recorded use of the term in print was in September 1939, in a US newspaper which used the British spelling, although other contemporary American reports sometimes used "phony" since both spellings were in use at the time in the US. The term appeared in Great Britain by January 1940 as "phoney", the only acceptable spelling there.

The term "Phoney War" was probably coined by US Senator William Borah, who, commenting in September 1939 on the inactivity on the Western Front, said, "There is something phoney about this war."

Inactivity

In March 1939, the UK and France formalized plans in place for how a war against Germany would be conducted. Knowing that likely enemies would be more prepared, and have land and air superiority, the strategy was to defeat any enemy offensive, to allow time for economic and naval superiority to build up military resources. To this end, the UK initially committed to two divisions being sent to France, and two more eleven months later.
However, the Polish Army general plan for defence, Plan West, assumed that the Allies' offensive on the Western front would provide significant relief to the Polish front in the East.

While most of the German army was engaged in Poland, a much smaller German force manned the Siegfried Line, their fortified defensive line along the French border. On 7 September, the French launched the Saar Offensive, but had to withdraw when their artillery could not penetrate German defences. A further assault was planned for 20 September, but on 17 September, following the USSR's invasion of Poland, the assault was called off. In the air, the RAF launched a bombing raid against Wilhelmshaven on the 4th of September, although this proved costly. There were occasional dogfights between fighter planes. The Royal Air Force dropped propaganda leaflets on Germany, and the first Canadian troops arrived in Britain, and the first BEF divisions completed their transfer to France, while western Europe was under a period of uneasy calm for seven months.

In the first few months of the war, Germany still hoped to persuade Britain to agree to peace. Although London hospitals prepared for 300,000 casualties in the first week, Germany unexpectedly did not immediately attack British cities by air, and German pilots that attacked Scottish naval bases said that they would have been court-martialled and executed for bombing civilians. Both sides found that attacks on military targets, such as a British attack on Kiel on the second night of the war, led to high losses of aircraft. They also feared retaliation for bombing civilians. (Britain and France did not realise that Germany used 90% of its frontline aircraft during the Polish invasion.) Civilian attitudes in Britain towards their German foes were still not as intense as they were to become after the Blitz. On 30 April 1940, a German Heinkel 111 bomber crashed at Clacton-on-Sea in Essex, killing its crew and injuring 160 people on the ground. The crew were laid to rest in the local cemetery with support from the Royal Air Force. Wreaths with messages of sympathy were displayed on the coffins. British pilots mapped the Siegfried Line while German troops waved at them.

When Leopold Amery suggested to Kingsley Wood that the Black Forest be bombed with incendiaries to burn its ammunition dumps, Wood—the Secretary of State for Air—amazed the member of parliament by responding that the forest was "private property" and could not be bombed; neither could weapons factories, as the Germans might do the same. Some British officers in France imported packs of foxhounds and beagles in 1939, but were thwarted by the French authorities in their attempts at introducing live foxes.

In their hurry to re-arm, Britain and France both bought large amounts of weapons from manufacturers in the US at the outbreak of hostilities, supplementing their own production. The non-belligerent US contributed to the Western Allies with discounted sales.

Despite the relative calm on land, on the high seas, the war was very real. Within a few hours of the declaration of war, the British liner  was torpedoed off the Hebrides with the loss of 112 lives in what was to be the beginning of the long-running Battle of the Atlantic. On 4 September, the Allies announced a blockade of Germany to prevent her importing food and raw materials to sustain her war effort; the Germans immediately declared a counter-blockade while the Soviet Union helped Germany with supplies bypassing the blockade. RAF Bomber Command, Britain's principal offensive arm, was also heavily engaged, but found that daylight bombing caused little damage and cost insupportable losses (e.g., 12 out of 22 Wellington bombers were shot down in an air battle over the Wilhelmshaven naval base on 18 December 1939).

At the Nuremberg trials, German military commander Alfred Jodl said that "if we did not collapse already in the year 1939 that was due only to the fact that during the Polish campaign, the approximately 110 French and British divisions in the West were held completely inactive against the 23 German divisions." General Siegfried Westphal stated that if the French had attacked in force in September 1939 the German army "could only have held out for one or two weeks".

Saar offensive

The Saar Offensive was a French attack into the Saarland defended by the German 1st Army. Its purpose was to assist Poland. The assault was stopped after a few kilometres and the French forces withdrew. According to the Franco-Polish military convention, the French Army was to start preparations for a major offensive three days after the beginning of mobilisation. The French forces were to effectively gain control over the area between the French border and the German lines and were to probe the German defences. On the 15th day of the mobilisation (that is on 16 September), the French Army was to start a full-scale assault on Germany. The preemptive mobilisation was started in France on 26 August, and on 1 September full mobilisation was declared.

The offensive in the Rhine river valley area started on 7 September, four days after France declared war on Germany. Since the Wehrmacht was occupied in the attack on Poland, the French soldiers enjoyed a decisive numerical advantage along their border with Germany. Eleven French divisions advanced along a  line near Saarbrücken against weak German opposition. The attack did not result in the diversion of any German troops. The all-out assault was to have been carried out by roughly 40 divisions, including one armoured, three mechanised divisions, 78 artillery regiments and 40 tank battalions. The half-hearted offensive was halted after France seized the Warndt Forest,  of heavily mined German territory.

On 12 September, the Anglo-French Supreme War Council gathered for the first time at Abbeville. It was decided that all offensive actions were to be halted immediately as the French opted to fight a defensive war, forcing the Germans to come to them. Poland was not notified of this decision. Instead, Gamelin informed Marshal Edward Rydz-Śmigły that half of his divisions were in contact with the enemy and that French advances had forced the Wehrmacht to withdraw at least six divisions from Poland. The following day, the commander of the French Military Mission to Poland, General Louis Faury, informed the Polish Chief of Staff—General Wacław Stachiewicz—that the major offensive on the western front planned from 17–20 September had to be postponed. At the same time, French divisions were ordered to withdraw to their barracks along the Maginot Line, beginning the Phoney War.

Winter War

A notable event during the Phoney War was the Winter War, which started with the Soviet Union's assault on Finland on 30 November 1939. Public opinion, particularly in France and Britain, found it easy to side with Finland, and demanded from their governments effective action in support of "the brave Finns" against their much larger aggressor, the Soviet Union, particularly since the Finns' defence seemed so much more successful than that of the Poles during the September Campaign. As a consequence of its attack, the Soviet Union was expelled from the League of Nations, and a proposed Franco-British expedition to northern Scandinavia was much debated. British forces that began to be assembled to send to Finland's aid were not dispatched before the Winter War ended, but were sent instead to Norway's aid in the Norwegian campaign. On 20 March, after the Winter War had ended, Édouard Daladier resigned as Prime Minister of France, partially due to his failure to aid Finland's defence.

German invasion of Denmark and Norway

The open discussions on an Allied expedition to northern Scandinavia, also without the consent of the neutral Scandinavian countries, and the Altmark Incident on 16 February, alarmed the Kriegsmarine and Germany by threatening iron ore supplies and gave strong arguments for Germany securing the Norwegian coast. Codenamed Operation Weserübung, the German invasion of Denmark and Norway commenced on 9 April. From the 14th, Allied troops were landed in Norway, but by the end of the month, southern parts of Norway were in German hands. The fighting continued in the north until the Allies evacuated in early June in response to the German invasion of France; the Norwegian forces in mainland Norway laid down their arms at midnight on 9 June.

Change of British government

The debacle of the Allied campaign in Norway, which was actually an offshoot of the never-realised plans to aid Finland, forced a famous debate in the House of Commons during which the British Prime Minister Neville Chamberlain was under constant attack. A nominal vote of confidence in his government was won by 281 to 200, but many of Chamberlain's supporters had voted against him while others had abstained. Chamberlain found it impossible to continue to lead a National Government or to form a new coalition government with himself as the leader. So on 10 May, Chamberlain resigned the premiership but retained the leadership of the Conservative Party. Winston Churchill, who had been a consistent opponent of Chamberlain's policy of appeasement, became Chamberlain's successor. Churchill formed a new coalition government that included members of the Conservatives, Labour and the Liberal Party, as well as several ministers from a non-political background.

Actions
Most other major actions during the Phoney War were at sea, including the Second Battle of the Atlantic fought throughout the Phoney War. Other notable events among these were:
 A German submarine sank the ship SS Athenia on the first day of the war, killing 117 civilian passengers and crew.
 4 September 1939, Royal Air Force daylight bombing raids on major Kriegsmarine warships in the Heligoland Bight proved a costly failure. Seven of the Bristol Blenheim and Vickers Wellington bombers were shot down without any ships being hit. Further ineffective anti-shipping raids in the same area on 14 and 18 December led to the loss of 17 Wellingtons and the abandonment of daylight operations by RAF heavy bombers.
She went down in 15 minutes with the loss of 519 of her crew, including her captain. She was the first British warship to be lost in the war.
The death toll reached 833 men, including Rear-Admiral Henry Blagrove, commander of the 2nd Battleship Division.
 Luftwaffe air raids on Britain began on 16 October 1939 when Junkers Ju 88s attacked British warships at Rosyth on the Firth of Forth. Spitfires of 602 and 603 Squadrons succeeded in shooting down two Ju 88s and a Heinkel He 111 over the firth. In a raid on Scapa Flow the next day, one Ju 88 was hit by anti-aircraft fire, crashing on the island of Hoy. The first Luftwaffe plane to be shot down on the British mainland was a He 111 at Haddington, East Lothian, on 28 October, with both 602 and 603 Squadrons claiming this victory. 602 Squadron's Archie McKellar was a principal pilot in both the destruction of the first German attacker over water and over British soil. McKellar (KIA 1 Nov. 1940) went on to be credited with 20 kills during the Battle of Britain, as well as "ace in a day" status by shooting down five Bf 109s; a feat accomplished by only 24 RAF pilots during the entire war.
Admiral Graf Spee fled to Montevideo harbour to carry out repairs on the damage sustained during the battle. She was later scuttled rather than face a large British fleet that the Kriegsmarine believed, incorrectly, was awaiting her departure. The support vessel for Admiral Graf Spee, the tanker  was captured by the Royal Navy in February 1940 in southern Norway. (See: Battles of Narvik, Altmark Incident.)
 On 19 February 1940, a Kriegsmarine destroyer flotilla embarked on Operation Wikinger, a sortie into the North Sea to disrupt British fishing and submarine activity around the Dogger Bank. En route, two destroyers were lost due to mines and friendly fire from the Luftwaffe; nearly 600 German sailors were killed and the mission was then aborted without ever encountering Allied forces.

British war planning had called for a "knockout blow" by strategic bombing of German industry with the RAF's substantial Bomber Command. However, there was considerable apprehension about German retaliation, and when President Franklin D. Roosevelt proposed an agreement not to mount any bombing raids which might endanger civilians, Britain and France agreed immediately and Germany agreed two weeks later. The RAF therefore conducted a large number of combined reconnaissance and propaganda leaflet flights over Germany. These operations were jokingly termed "pamphlet raids" or "Confetti War" in the British press.

On 10 May 1940, eight months after Britain and France had declared war on Germany, German troops marched into Belgium, the Netherlands and Luxembourg, marking the end of the Phoney War and the beginning of the Battle of France.

Italy, hoping for territorial gains when France was defeated, entered the war on 10 June 1940, although the thirty-two Italian divisions which crossed the border with France enjoyed little success against five defending French divisions.

See also
 Operation Pike
 Western betrayal
 Why Die for Danzig?

Notes

References

Further reading
 Pierre Porthault, L'armée du sacrifice (1939–1940), Guy Victor, 1965

External links
 

Conflicts in 1939
Conflicts in 1940
Western European theatre of World War II
Politics of World War II
Wars involving Germany
Wars involving Denmark
Wars involving France
Wars involving Norway
Wars involving the United Kingdom
1939 in Europe
1940 in Europe